Straszęcin  is a village in the administrative district of Gmina Żyraków, within Dębica County, Subcarpathian Voivodeship, in south-eastern Poland. Between 1988 and 1990 Straszęcin had been connected with Dębica by trolleybus line.

The village has a population of 1,500.

References

Villages in Dębica County